Mahmud Hasan may refer to:

 Mahmud al-Hasan (1851–1920), Deobandi Sunni Muslim scholar
 Mahmud Hasan (academic) (1897–?), vice-chancellor of the University of Dhaka